Cheon, also spelled Chun or Chon, is an uncommon Korean surname. It is written with either of two hanja:

  meaning "thousand". This is the more common character, used as a surname by 103,811 people in 32,229 households in South Korea, according to the 2000 census.
 , meaning "heaven". The 2000 census found 8,416 people in 2,668 households who used this character to write their surname.

In a study by the National Institute of Korean Language based on 2007 application data for South Korean passports, it was found that 50% of people with this family name spelled it in Latin letters as Cheon in their passports, while 42% spelled it Chun, and 3.5% spelled it Chon. Rarer alternative spellings (the remaining 4.5%) included Choun and the Yale romanization Chen.

People with this surname include:

Sportspeople
 Cheon Seong-tae (born 1943), South Korean rower
 Cheon In-sik (born 1968), South Korean sprint canoer
 Cheon Eun-suk (born 1969), South Korean basketball player
 Cheon Hui-ju (born 1975), South Korean female speed skater
 Cheon Ju-hyeon (born 1977), South Korean male speed skater
 Cheon Min-ho (born 1987), South Korean sport shooter
 Cheon Seul-ki (born 1989), South Korean field hockey player who competed at the 2012 Summer Olympics
 Cheon Eun-bi (born 1992), South Korean field hockey player who competed at the 2012 and 2016 Summer Olympics

Writers
 Cheon Sang-byeong (1930–1993), South Korean male poet
 Cheon Yang-hee (born 1942), South Korean female poet
 Cheon Myeong-kwan (born 1964), South Korean novelist
 Cheon Un-yeong (born 1971), South Korean writer of short stories

Other
 Taksu Cheon (born 1958), Japanese physicist
 Cheon Ho-jin (born 1960), South Korean actor
 Cheon Jinwoo (born 1962), South Korean professor of nanomedicine
 Cheon Ho-sun (born 1962), South Korean politician
 Cheon, Jung Hee (born 1969), South Korean mathematician
 Cheon Jun-ho (born 1971), South Korean politician
 Mina Cheon (born 1973), South Korean-born American artist
 Cheon Jeong-myeong (born 1980), South Korean actor

See also
List of Korean family names
Yeongyang Cheon clan

References

Korean-language surnames